The Challenge Trophy is a national amateur soccer cup in Canada contested by the champions of individual provincial soccer competitions. It is one of the oldest soccer competitions in Canada, being held since 1913. It is run by the Canadian Soccer Association.

History
An unofficial Dominion championship for a trophy donated by The People newspaper of London, named the Peoples Shield, was contested from 1906–1912.  Teams from all provinces did not enter the competition in each year, and it was contested by Western Canada in its last years.

On May 24, 1912, the Amateur Athletic Union met in Toronto to determine a competition to crown a Canadian national champion. That year, the executive of the Dominion of Canada Football Association invited the Duke of Connaught to become the Patron of the Association. The Duke donated the Connaught Cup to the FA, which became the championship of Canadian soccer. In 1926, the English FA donated a new trophy to replace it as the national championship named the Challenge Trophy.

The inaugural competition in 1913 and the 1914 edition both featured four teams in a league format; both were won by Manitoba side Norwood Wanderers. From 1915 to 1955, the final was generally played as a best-of-three series between the champions of the west and the champions of the east. The single-game final used today was first implemented in 1956.

In 1927, the previously amateur-only tournament opened to professional teams. Prior to 1940, fifteen finals were played at Carruthers Park in Winnipeg (1923–1939), (roughly halfway across the country) five in Toronto and one each in Vancouver and Montreal.

From 1954 to 1961, the trophy was replaced by the Carling Cup. The original Challenge Trophy is now retired and on display at Canada Soccer House in Ottawa, Ontario.

The tournament acted as a men's national championship at the highest level in Canadian soccer in its early years, however, professional and semi-professional tournaments have taken on more importance in recent decades, including the Canadian Championship.

Qualifying competitions and participants
Provincial championships determine the teams competing in The Challenge Trophy:
British Columbia: B.C. Provincial Championship winners
Alberta: Alberta Cup winners
Saskatchewan: Saskatchewan Open Cup winners
Manitoba: Manitoba Cup winners
Ontario: Ontario Cup winners
Quebec: LSEQ winners
New Brunswick: Winner by acclamation
Prince Edward Island: Winner by acclamation
Nova Scotia: Nova Scotia Cup winners
Newfoundland and Labrador: Newfoundland and Labrador Challenge Cup winners
Yukon: Winner by acclamation
Northwest Territories: Winner by acclamation

Winners

Titles

By provincial association

By club

See also
Soccer in Canada
History of the Canadian Soccer Association
List of soccer clubs in Canada

References
General
Canada Soccer Past Winners
The Connaught Series
Canada Soccer Records & Results

More

 
Soccer cup competitions in Canada
1912 establishments in Canada
Recurring sporting events established in 1912